Harmon v. Tyler, 273 U.S. 668 (1927), was a unanimous United States Supreme Court decision addressing racial segregation in residential areas. The Court held that a New Orleans, Louisiana ordinance requiring residential segregation based on race violated the Fourteenth Amendment.  The Court relied on the authority of Buchanan v. Warley.

References 

United States Supreme Court cases
United States equal protection case law
1927 in United States case law
Civil rights movement case law
20th century in New Orleans
United States racial desegregation case law
United States Supreme Court cases of the Taft Court